The Medway Quarry railway line is a private railway line in New South Wales, Australia, owned by Blue Circle Southern Cement Company. It is a short branch from the Main South line serving the Medway limestone quarry. The junction for the line, Medway Junction, lies between Tallong and Marulan railway stations.

See also 
 Rail transport in New South Wales

References 

Regional railway lines in New South Wales
Standard gauge railways in Australia